Laia Aubert (born 10 May 1986) is a Spanish cross-country skier. She competed in two events at the 2006 Winter Olympics.

References

External links
 

1986 births
Living people
Spanish female cross-country skiers
Olympic cross-country skiers of Spain
Cross-country skiers at the 2006 Winter Olympics
People from Osona
Sportspeople from the Province of Barcelona